The small woolly bat (Kerivoula intermedia) is a species of vesper bat in the family Vespertilionidae.
It is found only in Malaysia and is little known. It is only slightly larger than the Kitti's hog-nosed bat, one of the smallest mammals in the world. The small woolly bat weighs .

Description
The fur is orange-brown on the dorsal side, and a paler brown color on the ventral side of the bat. Both the base of the fur hairs as well as the wing membrane are dark in color. This bat is very similar in appearance to Kerivoula minuta, with the two species only being able to be distinguished morphologically by their weight, as their forearms overlap. Kerivoula intermedia is thought to always weigh over 2.5g, with Kerivoula minuta weighing 1.9-2.5g.

Biology
Breeding usually occurs from February to May, with a shorter breeding season happening between August and October.

References

Kerivoulinae
Bats of Malaysia
Endemic fauna of Malaysia
Taxonomy articles created by Polbot
Mammals described in 1984